Millie is a feminine given name (the article includes a list of people and fictional characters with the given name).

Mille may also refer to:

 Millie (dog), the pet of Barbara and George H. W. Bush
 Millie (film), a 1931 Hollywood film 
 "Millie" (short story), by Katherine Mansfield, 1913
 The Sun Military Awards, known as "Millies"
 Millie, a variant of card game Miss Milligan

See also
 
 Mille (disambiguation)
 Milli (disambiguation)
 Millia (disambiguation)
 Milly (disambiguation)
 Jeanne Scelles-Millie (1900–1993), born Jeanne Millie, French architectural engineer and author